Prenylthiol or 3-methyl-2-butene-1-thiol is a chemical compound. It is one of a group of chemicals that give cannabis its characteristic "skunk-like" aroma. It is also present in lightstruck or "skunky" beer.

References

Thiols